"The Last Night of a Jockey" is an episode of the American television anthology series The Twilight Zone. In this episode, a diminutive jockey's wish to be a big man is granted. Rod Serling wrote the episode specifically for Mickey Rooney, who is the only actor to appear in it.

Opening narration

Plot
A jockey named Michael Grady is lying alone in his room after being banned from horse racing for life for fixing races by horse doping. He drinks in his depression, and rues his five-foot height, which horse riding had served to compensate for. He then hears a voice. The voice introduces himself as "the alter ego" and claims to live in Grady's head. He argues with the alter ego, trying to justify his life and his actions, even lying about his crimes, but the alter ego knows all about him. Grady is offered the chance to change his life with one wish. Grady says his greatest wish is to be big. After Grady wakes from a nap he finds his wish has been granted; he is now close to eight feet tall.

Ecstatic, Grady calls his ex-girlfriend over the phone, but she dismisses him. He boasts that he can find more girls who will appreciate him because of his newfound height. The alter ego remains unimpressed, feeling Grady has not made good on any of his promises. He derides his dumb and "cheap" wish, and says that Grady could have wished to win the Kentucky Derby fairly, or perform a heroic act.

A telephone call from the racing commission informs Grady that he has been reinstated and can jockey again. Grady joyfully thanks everyone who petitioned to give him a second chance, but the alter ego laughs at him. Grady realizes he has become even larger, about 10 feet tall — too tall to ride a horse, or properly fit in his own apartment. Devastated, the now-giant Grady wrecks his room and pleads with the alter ego to make him small again. The alter ego denies the request, and instead replies, "You are small, Mr. Grady. You see, every time you won an honest race, that's when you were a giant. But right now, they just don't come any smaller."

Closing narration

Censorship
CBS's Program Practices department criticized this episode for use of the word "dwarf" in a negative context, suggesting that instead the terms "half-pint", "runt" or "shrimp" could be used.

Mickey Rooney and Rod Serling
Although this was Mickey Rooney's sole appearance on The Twilight Zone, he had earlier co-starred in two dramas written by Rod Serling — "The Comedian", a live 1957 episode of the 90-minute anthology series Playhouse 90, as well as the theatrical feature Requiem for a Heavyweight, a 1962 remake of the same-titled 1956 episode of Playhouse 90. The making of the as-yet-unreleased production was the subject of a discussion on the December 21, 1961 episode of the late-night talk show PM East, with guests Mickey Rooney, Rod Serling and the film's star Anthony Quinn. A decade later, in October 1972, Mickey Rooney co-starred in one additional Rod Serling teleplay — "Rare Objects" — a half-hour episode of the horror anthology series Night Gallery.

References
DeVoe, Bill. (2008). Trivia from The Twilight Zone. Albany, GA: Bear Manor Media. 
Grams, Martin. (2008). The Twilight Zone: Unlocking the Door to a Television Classic. Churchville, MD: OTR Publishing. 
Zicree, Marc Scott: The Twilight Zone Companion.  Sillman-James Press, 1982 (second edition)

External links

1963 American television episodes
The Twilight Zone (1959 TV series season 5) episodes
Fiction about size change
Television episodes written by Rod Serling
Television episodes about termination of employment